Galen College of Nursing is a private nursing school with multiple locations in the United States.

The college was established in Louisville, Kentucky, by Humana Inc., in 1989, and was originally known as Galen Health Institutes. The college originally offered only a one-year licensed practical nurse (LPN) program in Louisville, San Antonio, Texas, and St. Petersburg, Florida.

In 2005, the college gained accreditation from the Council on Occupational Education which permits the college to offer the two-year Associate of Science in Nursing degree that enables graduates to become registered nurses (RNs). In connection with these changes, the college adopted its current name, Galen College of Nursing. HCA Healthcare purchased a majority stake in the organization in 2020. The school now offers an additional online Bachelor of Science in Nursing (BSN) and Master of Science in Nursing (MSN) programs for RNs who wish to further their education.

Statistics

Ranking 
87th as best online bachelor's degree program

627th in nursing programs

Acceptance Rate 
30%-100% depending on the campus

Student Faculty Ratio 
1:13 on average per campus

NCLEX-RN Pass Rate 
Note that not all campus data is available for NCLEX-RN pass rate

 BSN (Bachelor of Science in Nursing)
 as of 2020 Louisville campus had 96.83% pass the first time
 as of 2020 San Antonio campus had 88.1% pass the first time
 as of 2020 Tampa Bay campus had 100% pass the first time
 ADN (Associate Degree Nursing)
 as of 2020 Cincinnati campus had 91.33% pass the first time
 as of 2020 Louisville campus had 87.29% pass the first time
 as of 2020 San Antonio campus had 88.64% pass the first time
 as of 2020 Hazard campus had 82.14% pass the first time
 as of 2020 Tampa Bay campus had 92.02% pass the first time

Accreditation 

 Southern Association of Colleges and Schools Commission on Colleges
 Accreditation Commission for Education in Nursing (ACEN)
 Commission on Collegiate Nursing Education

Campuses 

 Asheville, North Carolina
 Austin, Texas
 Cincinnati, Ohio
 Dallas (Richardson), Texas
 Gainesville, Florida
 Hazard, Kentucky
 Houston, Texas
 Louisville, Kentucky
 Miami, Florida
 Myrtle Beach, South Carolina
 Nashville, Tennessee
 Pikeville, Kentucky
 Richmond, Virginia
 Roanoke, Virginia
 San Antonio, Texas
 Sarasota, Florida
 Tampa Bay, Florida

Degrees and Programs 

 3-Year Bachelor of Science (BSN)
 Associate Degree in Nursing (ADN)
 LPN to ADN
 Online RN to BSN
 Online MSN, Nurse Educator
 Online MSN, Nursing and Healthcare Leadership
 Practical/Vocational Nursing
 Post-Master's Nurse Educator Certificate

See also
 Research College of Nursing

References

External links
 

Educational institutions accredited by the Council on Occupational Education
Nursing schools in Florida
Nursing schools in Kentucky
Nursing schools in Ohio
Nursing schools in Texas
Universities and colleges in Louisville, Kentucky
Private universities and colleges in Kentucky
Private universities and colleges in Florida
Private universities and colleges in Ohio
Private universities and colleges in Texas